Alabama Concerto is an album by composer John Benson Brooks featuring saxophonist Cannonball Adderley and trumpeter Art Farmer; it was released on the Riverside label in 1958. For Brooks, it was "an outgrowth of an assignment he had [...] to transcribe for a book some folk recordings made in Alabama by Harold Courlander"; these contrasted with New Orleans jazz recordings, causing Brooks to consider an alternative influence on the history of jazz.

Reception

Critic John S. Wilson, in a contemporaneous review, observed of the composer: "Working from several rural folk themes, he develops his Concerto through ensembles, written solos and improvised solos played by a quartet". Concluding in a negative vein, Wilson stated that the album "lacks movement and explicit development [...] the work becomes lost in monotony long before the two full LP sides have been completed." The Allmusic site awarded the album 3 stars with the review by Scott Yanow stating, "Although not essential, the music is thought-provoking, quite melodic, and looks backwards toward folk music of the 1800s while giving the pieces a 1950s jazz sensibility".

Track listing
All compositions by John Benson Brooks
 First Movement: THEMES: "The Henry John Story" / "Green, Green Rocky Road" / "Job's Red Wagon" - 4:49   
 First Movement: "The Henry John Story (return)" / "Green, Green Rocky Road (return)" - 3:17   
 First Movement: "Job's Red Wagon (return)" - 3:07   
 Second Movement: THEMES: "Trampin'" / "The Loop" / "Trampin' (return)" - 7:54   
 Second Movement: "The Loop (return)" - 2:25   
 Third Movement: THEME: "Little John Shoes" - 3:09   
 Third Movement: THEME: "Milord's Calling" / "Little John Shoes (return)" / "Milord's Callin' (return)" - 5:06   
 Fourth Movement: THEMES: "Blues for Christmas" / "Rufus Playboy" / "Grandma's Coffin" / "Blues for Christmas (return)" - 7:33   
 Fourth Movement: "Grandma's Coffin (return)" / "Rufus Playboy (return)" / "Grandma's Coffin (2nd return)" - 5:07

Personnel
John Benson Brooks - piano, arranger 
Cannonball Adderley - alto saxophone
Art Farmer - trumpet
Barry Galbraith - guitar
Milt Hinton - bass

References

1958 albums
Riverside Records albums
Cannonball Adderley albums